Barré Glacier is a channel glacier about  wide and  long, flowing north from the continental ice to the coast east of Cape Pepin in Antarctica. It was delineated from air photos taken by U.S. Navy Operation Highjump, 1946–47, and was named by the Advisory Committee on Antarctic Names for Michel Barré, leader of the French Antarctic Expedition wintering party of 1951–52, whose party extended reconnaissance of the coastal features as far west as this glacier.

See also
 List of glaciers in the Antarctic
 Glaciology

References

Glaciers of Adélie Land